The glassy flying squid  or glass squid (Hyaloteuthis pelagica) is the only species of the genus Hyaloteuthis of the subfamily Ommastrephinae, family Ommastrephidae. The Squid is 9 cm long.

The genus contains bioluminescent species.

References

Squid
Bioluminescent molluscs